Callophisma is a genus of moths of the family Noctuidae. The genus was erected by George Hampson in 1913.

Callophisma flavicornis Hampson, 1913
Callophisma viettei Laporte, 1975

References

Catocalinae